Mostotrest is the largest Russian heavy construction company. The company is focused in the construction of roads, rail, bridges and highways and other engineering constructions.

Activities
The company is the largest Russian bridge construction company. Since 1930 when the company was founded, Mostotrest  has completed over 7,500 infrastructure facilities including bridges, foot bridges, tunnels and complex transport interchanges. The company its subsidiaries has more than 33,233 employees and operates through 15 branches.

Mostotrest was awarded construction projects for the 2014 Winter Olympics worth $5.6 billion, and CEO Vladimir Vlasov was awarded a medal by Dmitry Medvedev for the company's work on the Olympics.

Ownership
A 94.2% stake in Mostotrest is controlled by TFK-Finance, an investment company of NPF Blagosostoyanie, a pension fund partly controlled by Russian Railways. The remaining 5.8% is in free float.

References 

Construction and civil engineering companies of Russia
Companies based in Moscow
Companies listed on the Moscow Exchange
1930 establishments in the Soviet Union
Construction and civil engineering companies established in 1930
Manufacturing companies of the Soviet Union
Russian entities subject to the U.S. Department of the Treasury sanctions